Stadionul Motorul is a multi-use stadium in Oradea, Romania. It is used mostly for football matches. In the past was the home of Motorul Oradea, FC Bihor Oradea youth squads and CA Oradea youth squads. The stadium holds 1,000 people.

References

Football venues in Romania
Buildings and structures in Bihor County
Sport in Oradea